Kingdom Under Fire is a video games series developed by Blueside and Phantagram.

Games
Kingdom Under Fire: A War of Heroes, a 2001 real-time strategy video game developed by Phantagram and published by Gathering of Developers
Kingdom Under Fire: The Crusaders, a 2004 tactical wargame developed by the Korean studio Phantagram for the Xbox
Kingdom Under Fire: Heroes,  a 2005 action strategy game, the prequel to Kingdom Under Fire: The Crusaders
Kingdom Under Fire: Circle of Doom, a 2007 action roleplaying video game developed by Blueside
Kingdom Under Fire II, a hybrid real-time strategy and roleplaying massively multiplayer online game

Video game franchises
Video game franchises introduced in 2001
Video games developed in South Korea
Video games featuring female protagonists